Marc Jean Roland Antoine Vouilloux  (born 28 May 1963) known professionally as Marc Antoine, is a jazz guitarist from France.

Biography

Early life
Marc Antoine was born Marc Jean Roland Antoine Vouilloux in Paris, France.

Recording career

Solo career
Hi-Lo Split, was released on Peak Records in 2007; the album features a cover of R&B and jazz classic "Spooky".

Discography 
 Classical Soul (GRP, 1994)
 Urban Gypsy (GRP, 1995) 
 Madrid (GRP, 1998) 
 Universal Language (GRP, 2000) 
 Cruisin'  (GRP, 2001) 
 Mediterranéo (Rendezvous Entertainment, 2003) 
 Modern Times (Rendezvous, 2005) 
 Hi-Lo Split  (Peak, 2007) 
 Foreign Exchange with Paul Brown (Peak, 2009) 
 My Classical Way (Frazzy Frog, 2010) 
 Guitar Destiny (Frazzy Frog, 2012)
 Laguna Beach (Woodward Avenue Records, 2016) 
 So Nice with David Benoit (Shanachie, 2017)
 Something About Her (Shanachie, 2021)

References

External links 
 Official site
 SmoothViews interview

French jazz guitarists
French male guitarists
Smooth jazz guitarists
1963 births
Living people
French male jazz musicians